X-Men: Evolution is an American animated television series based on the X-Men superhero team appearing in Marvel Comics. The series takes inspiration from the early issues of the source material and follows the X-Men as teenagers rather than adults, as they learn to control their developing mutant powers and face various threats. X-Men: Evolution ran for a total of four seasons comprising 52 episodes from November 4, 2000 to October 25, 2003 on Kids' WB, which made it the third longest-running Marvel Comics animated series at the time, behind Fox Kids' X-Men and Spider-Man. The series was aired on Disney XD from June 15, 2009, to December 30, 2011.

Produced in the United States, the voice recording was done in Canada and the show was animated in Japan and South Korea. The series was released by Warner Bros. Television Studios, currently the rights are owned by Walt Disney Television in the United States.

Plot

Season 1
Season one focuses on introducing the core characters of the series. The titular team founded by Professor Charles Xavier competes with Mystique to recruit young mutants with newly discovered superpowers to their cause. At the Xavier's School for Gifted Youngsters, the teenage X-Men are taught by Xavier, Wolverine and Storm to control their abilities and keep them hidden from the rest of society whist attending high school in Bayville, Massachusetts. Their ranks grow over the course of the season and ultimately include Cyclops, Jean Grey, Nightcrawler, Shadowcat, Spyke, and Rogue, who is initially manipulated into joining Mystique's Brotherhood of Mutants.

While the X-Men teach their recruits to exercise restraint and uphold responsibility, Mystique encourages the Brotherhood to recklessly use their powers for selfish gain. The juvenile delinquents inducted into the Brotherhood consist of Avalanche, Toad, Blob, and Quicksilver. The mastermind behind Mystique and the Brotherhood is eventually revealed to be Magneto, a shadowy and mysterious figure from Xavier's past who seeks to enable mutants to replace humans as the dominant species on the planet. Nightcrawler also learns that he is Mystique's biological son, who was lost to her long ago due to Magneto's interference.

Other villains in the season are Wolverine's old rival Sabretooth, Xavier's vengeful half-brother Juggernaut, and Weapon X professor Andre Thorton.

Season 2
Season two focuses on the continuing conflict between the X-Men, Magneto and Mystique. Beast joins the X-Men as a teacher as a cohort of new mutants are added to their ranks, including Iceman, Magma, Jubilee, Cannonball, Berzerker, Multiple, Sunspot, Wolfsbane, and Boom Boom, who soon leaves the team and becomes a neutral character. Angel uses his powers to help people but chooses not to join the X-Men.

Cyclops and Jean grow closer, creating a love triangle when Rogue develops a crush on Cyclops, while Shadowcat and Avalanche begin dating despite being on opposing sides.

The X-Men are faced with several threats: Mystique strikes off with the Brotherhood and recruits the Scarlet Witch, Magneto's abandoned daughter and Quicksilver's sister, to seek revenge; Mesmero plots to free the ancient mutant Apocalypse; and Magneto forms a new group of mutant followers called the Acolytes, comprising Sabretooth, Gambit, Pyro, and Colossus. The existence of mutants is ultimately revealed to the world when Magneto pits the X-Men and the Brotherhood against Bolivar Trask's anti-mutant weapon, the Sentinel. The X-Men discover that Mystique has been posing as Xavier, who is now missing.

Season 3
Season three focuses on the rising tension and hostility between mutants and humans. After Xavier is found and rescued, the X-Men attempt to rebuild their normal lives in Bayville and continue using their powers for good, though they face public scrutiny and discrimination from the other students at school.

The X-Men are forced to contend with numerous personal struggles: Spyke leaves the team to join the sewer-dwelling Morlocks when his mutation rapidly advances; Nightcrawler overcomes his insecurities about his appearance; Rogue learns that Mystique is her adoptive mother and loses control of her powers; and Wolverine discovers that he has a clone called X-23, a teenage girl created by HYDRA to be trained and used as a weapon.

Meanwhile, Magneto enlists Mastermind to alter Scarlet Witch's memories to end her vendetta against him; and Mesmero manipulates Mystique and hypnotizes Rogue into helping him resurrect Apocalypse, who defeats the combined forces of the X-Men, the Brotherhood and the Acolytes.

Season 4
Season four focuses on the aftermath of the X-Men's failed attempt to prevent Apocalypse's revival. The Brotherhood try their hand at heroism only for their selfish tendencies to prevail; Wolverine and X-23 work together to bring down HYDRA; Xavier confronts his estranged son David; Spyke and the Morlocks begin fighting back against human prejudice; Shadowcat befriends Danielle Moonstar; and Rogue pushes Mystique's petrified statue off a cliff, creating a rift between her and Nightcrawler, which causes her to seek redemption by helping Gambit to rescue his father.

Apocalypse captures and transforms Xavier, Storm, Magneto, and Mystique into his Four Horsemen as he attempts to turn the human population into mutants. In the final battle against Apocalypse, the X-Men and their allies defeat the Horseman, who are returned to normal, while Rogue absorbs the powers of Dorian Leach to neutralize Apocalypse and trap him in his tomb forever. Rogue and Nightcrawler rebuff Mystique's attempt to make amends; Magneto reconciles with Quicksilver and Scarlet Witch; Shadowcat and Avalanche rekindle their relationship; Spyke reconnects with his aunt Storm; and Xavier sees his students reunited as the X-Men.

The series ends with a speech by Xavier, having caught a glimpse of the not-too-distant future in Apocalypse's mind that shows:
 Continued anti-mutant sentiment.
 A reformed Magneto as a new instructor at Xavier's institute.
 Jean being consumed by the all-powerful Phoenix Force. Had the series continued, the fifth season would have focused on the Dark Phoenix saga with Jean becoming an enemy of the X-Men.
 The future X-Men team consisting of Cyclops, Nightcrawler, Shadowcat, Storm, Beast, Iceman, Colossus, X-23, and Rogue, who is now capable of flight and no longer wearing gloves, implying that she has permanently absorbed Ms. Marvel's powers and gained full control over her own mutant abilities.
 The Brotherhood, including Pyro, joining S.H.I.E.L.D. as the Freedom Force.
 A fleet of Sentinels led by Nimrod.
 A final photographic portrait of the full X-Men roster, including new members Havok, Angel, Gambit, Colossus, and X-23.

Episodes

Cast and characters

 Professor Charles Xavier (voiced by David Kaye) is the telepathic founder and pacifistic leader of the X-Men. Nicknamed "Professor X" by his students, he remains somewhat secretive to protect the young mutants in his care. Although he often emphasizes the importance of keeping their powers hidden from the rest of the world, Xavier remains hopeful that mutants and humans can one day coexist peacefully.
 Scott Summers / Cyclops (voiced by Kirby Morrow) is the disciplined and responsible field leader of the X-Men. His eyes constantly emit powerful energy beams known as "optic blasts", which can only be controlled by his ruby-quartz glasses and visor. Scott harbors romantic affections for his best friend Jean, but only confesses his feelings for her in the third season, after which they begin dating.
 Jean Grey (voiced by Venus Terzo) is a popular girl with powerful telepathic and telekinetic abilities. She finds herself romantically torn between Duncan Matthews and Scott, until she and Scott begin dating in the third season.
 Evan Daniels / Spyke (voiced by Neil Denis) is Ororo's playful and stubborn nephew and the youngest member of the X-Men. He has the ability to project bone-like protrusions from his skin. Evan leaves the X-Men to join the Morlocks when he loses control of his powers in the third season.
 Logan / Wolverine (voiced by Scott McNeil) is the "gruff uncle" of the X-Men and the strict instructor in charge of the young mutants' combat and survival training. He possesses heightened senses, a regenerative healing factor and an indestructible adamantium skeleton with retractable hand claws. Logan has also shown a softer side as a protective surrogate father to both his clone X-23 and Rogue after she loses control of her powers.
 Ororo Munroe / Storm (voiced by Kirsten Williamson) is Evan's aunt and a wise mentor to the X-Men who can harness the forces of nature and manipulate the weather. She was previously worshipped as a goddess in Africa due to her ability to summon the rains.
 Rogue (voiced by Meghan Black) is a sullen and reclusive goth girl who can absorb the life force, attributes, memories, and powers of anyone through physical touch. She is Mystique's adopted daughter and Kurt's foster sister. Rogue is initially tricked into joining the Brotherhood of Mutants before defecting to the X-Men. She develops an unrequited crush on Scott but eventually becomes attracted to Gambit, an Acolyte working for Magneto. Rogue's real name is never revealed in the series.
 Kitty Pryde / Shadowcat (voiced by Maggie Blue O'Hara) is an upbeat and cheerful girl who can become intangible. She is the second youngest member of the X-Men and develops a close friendship with Kurt over the course of the series. Despite being on opposing teams, Kitty begins dating Avalanche of the Brotherhood of Mutants in the second season.
 Kurt Wagner / Nightcrawler (voiced by Brad Swaile) is the blue-furred prankster of the X-Men with the ability to teleport. He is Mystique's biological son and Rogue's foster brother. Kurt develops a close friendship with Kitty and his penchant for excessive goofiness initially clashes with Scott's rule-abiding leadership. He is insecure about his appearance and given a holographic image inducer that allows him to blend in at school, though he comes to embrace his true self over the course of the series.
 Hank McCoy / Beast (voiced by Michael Kopsa) is a mild-mannered intellectual with a repressed, feral alternative mutant personality. He initially works as a gym coach and chemistry teacher at Bayville High School before his latent transformation forces him to retire and join the X-Men as a mentor in the second season.

Music
X-Men: Evolution featured several songs that were produced exclusively for the show:
 "Only a Girl (The Bayville Sirens' Theme)" in "Walk on the Wild Side".
 "T-O-A-D (Toad's Theme)" in "The Toad, the Witch and the Wardrobe".
 "Who Am I Now? (Rogue's Theme)" in "Rogue Recruit".
 "Wolverine (Wolverine's Theme)" in a promotional video.
 "Evolution Theme (Theme Song)" in the start of the show.

The theme and score for X-Men: Evolution was composed and produced by William Kevin Anderson.  Several characters had distinct musical cues, including Avalanche (heavy guitar riffs), Storm (orchestra piece), and Apocalypse (Egyptian music). Others had special sound effects. These include Jean Grey (light chime noise), Sabretooth (roaring), Rogue (also has a unique, black and white special effect), Magneto, Gambit, Shadowcat, and Nightcrawler. The main theme song was recorded by Anderson.

Production notes
One of the main points of the new X-Men: Evolution concept was the design of the new costumes. Early concept art sketches show the X-Men in classic gold-and-black garb. In these drafts, Spyke wears cornrows, Rogue's outfit exposes her midriff, and Jean Grey's costume is the female version of Cyclops' costume. Both Jean Grey and Shadowcat wear face masks, and Kitty is also wearing an orange miniskirt and Doc Martens over spandex. Early Storm drawings show her wearing white rather than black.

A point of controversy was the design of the blue-skinned villain Mystique. Steven E. Gordon, the character designer and director of various episodes, was never impressed with the Mystique designs for the first season. Mystique was originally to be presented as nude (as in the films), but Warner Brothers did not want this included in a Kids' WB! production. However, a short scene of Mystique drawn to resemble her film counterpart (albeit clothed) appears in the Season 1 finale. Gordon stopped directing after two seasons, but continued to design characters for the show. He is most satisfied with the designs of Rogue and Wanda.

The show also contained various pop culture references: in episode 9 of the first season, one of Wolverine's defensive programs for the Danger Room is referred to as "Logan's Run X13", a clear reference to the novel/film Logan's Run.  The Rogue/Kitty dance in "Spykecam" was modeled after a similar dance in the Buffy the Vampire Slayer episode "Bad Girls". The play used in the first-season episode "Spykecam", Dracula: The Musical, is a real play. The song used, however, is an original song made for the episode. The writers of the show have also admitted that they were fans of Buffy the Vampire Slayer. Using Shadowcat as the catalyst, the two shows appear similar: a teenage girl with superpowers fights powerful villains in order to save her high school. Buffy creator Joss Whedon has openly credited his inspiration for Buffy as Kitty Pryde.

Starting with the first episode of Season 4, "Impact", the episode title was no longer aired on-screen at the beginning of the show, and X-Men: Evolution became the third longest-running Marvel cartoon, behind Spider-Man: The Animated Series (5 seasons, 65 episodes) and X-Men: The Animated Series (5 seasons, 76 episodes). Boyd Kirkland, the show's producer, says his favorite X-Men: Evolution season is Season 3. The monthly budget for X-Men: Evolution was $350,000.

This is the first X-Men animated series to use digital ink and paint.

Produced in the United States, the voice recording was done in Canada and the show was animated in Japan and South Korea. Most of the animation was outsourced to Madhouse, Mook Animation in Japan, DR Movie, and WHITE LINE in South Korea.

Successors
The show gave birth to a new series, Wolverine and the X-Men, which began airing in November 2009. It was not a continuation of X-Men: Evolution, though the same creative team was behind the show: Craig Kyle, Chris Yost, Steven E. Gordon, Greg Johnson and Boyd Kirkland all returned to work on the series.

In 2012, Jean Grey and Robert Kelly (voiced by their respective X-Men: Evolution actors) appeared in the Iron Man: Armored Adventures episode "The X-Factor".

Reception 
According to IGN, the show aired "much to X-fans' initial protests and lamentations." RPGnet enjoyed Evolution's second season, hailing it as the show's "transition season." An improvement over the show's first season "in every way," X-Men: Evolution, according to RPGnet, "introduc[ed] many ... re-imagined characters from X-Men lore that will certainly entertain the X-Men fans," specifically Beast and Principal Kelley. RPGnet wrote, "Some episodes could easily be cut out of the show and they would not be missed," describing the dialogue as "atrocious at times" and some of the characters as "very one dimensional." Positively, Fred Choi of The Tech hailed X-Men: Evolution as "the best incarnation of X-Men yet," admitting that "There are a few changes which will send purists howling in the streets." Choi acknowledged that "The students generally have abilities more powerful than they ever had in the comics," specifically mentioning intangible Shadowcat and telekinetic Jean Grey. While praising the show's animation and music – "cleaner than the original series" – Choi described the transformation of Rogue "into a reclusive goth chick" as " completely baffling but surprisingly palatable."

Noting the show's treatment of its characters, specifically making them high school teenagers for thematic purposes as "admirable," John G. Nettles of PopMatters concluded, "What disappoints, however, is the sheer number of missed opportunities here and the decision to subscribe to the same old social norms." Reviewing X-Men: Evolution's third season, Filip Vukcevic of IGN was mixed in his analysis, deeming it inferior to X-Men: The Animated Series and concluding, "Evolution ... will interest long-time X-fans, but the fluffy stories and underutilized character personalities ... will cause discerning viewers to zone out," suffering from its attempt "to cram everyone in." Additionally, the author felt that Evolution lacks the "visual flair" of The Batman and the "wit" of Teen Titans. The author also panned the series' "average" voice acting, feeling that Magneto, Wolverine and Beast were "miscast."  He also noted that combined with "inventive gags," "the show does its best to make the most of the mutants' powers" because "The fight scenes are fun to watch if only to see how the characters interact."

Awards and nominations
X-Men: Evolution won the award for Outstanding Sound Mixing – Special Class at the 28th Daytime Emmy Awards, on May 18, 2001 and won the award for Outstanding Sound Editing – Live Action and Animation at the 30th Daytime Emmy Awards, on May 16, 2003.

It also won the Cover of the Year Award in 2004 for best animated figure for Beast. It was nominated for several Golden Reel Awards, as well as other Emmys. Steven E. Gordon, the director of this show, was nominated in the Production Design in an Animated Television Production category for X-Men: Evolution at the 2001 Annie Awards.

Analysis

Comparison with original comics 
The X-Men: Evolution series was targeted at a younger audience and as such portrays the majority of characters as teenagers rather than adults like in X-Men: The Animated Series. In the series, like many animated series based on comics, completely new characters were introduced including Spyke. As much of the cast were teenagers, they are shown regularly attending high school in addition to the Xavier's Institute. At the latter, Professor X, Storm, Wolverine and later Beast also acted as their teachers at the institute. Beast also served as a teacher to the cast at high school prior to his transformation.

X-Men: Evolution is set in Bayville, New York, the state established in the episode "The Beast of Bayville", where Kitty Pryde receives a package addressed to Bayville, New York. Furthermore, in the early part of the series (until the end of season 2) most people are unaware of the existence of mutants. Also, the "Brotherhood" team is not known as the "Brotherhood of Evil Mutants" within the context of this series. They are not a team of terrorists or mutant supremacists. Instead, the Brotherhood is made up of misfit mutants who often oppose the X-Men (in physical, social and philosophical realms).

The series was created as a stark contrast to X-Men: The Animated Series. The series' bible was written by Robert N. Skir and Marty Isenberg (albeit uncredited), who meant to take The X-Men back to their roots as high school students learning to control their superpowers, as when the comics termed them "The Strangest Teens of All". Whereas the Fox series reflected the then-current role of X-Men as freedom fighters battling persecution and bigotry against mutantkind, X-Men: Evolution used the theme of mutant powers as a metaphor for the struggles of adolescence.

The look of the series was designed by Producer Boyd Kirkland and artist Frank Paur, who created new costumes for the X-Men, replacing the comics-faithful designs of X-Men: The Animated Series with anime-influenced costumes which were much more animation-friendly.

The first season mainly concerned the characters' conflict with Magneto's Brotherhood of Mutants as well as served as an introductory to many of the characters to allow people to get used to these new teenage versions. Later seasons predominantly featured Apocalypse as an adversary, introduced versions of the New Mutants, Morlocks and Magneto's Acolytes as well as posed the U.S. Government as an adversary to all parties.

The series revealed a detailed knowledge of canon history in a number of small ways. Examples include the evolution of Cerebro from a console device, Shadowcat's initial uneasiness around Nightcrawler and Forge's scientific arrogance along with his devices causing unintended consequences. Rogue is shown to absorb Cyclops' powers in the correct manner. In the Fox series, she also absorbed his lack of control over his beams (which was a result of a brain injury, not inherent in his powers). X-Men: Evolution shows her with full control over them, just as Scott would if he had not sustained a brain injury. In "Survival of the Fittest", Xavier says that Juggernaut acquired his powers through mysticism (but unlike the comic, says that it unlocked a latent mutant power), and in "The Cauldron" Magneto develops his mutant-enhancing technology from that same Jewel of Cyttorak (but says that he has found it to be scientific rather than mystical). In "Day of Recovery", Toad is seen to be quite comfortable with technology and in "Operation Rebirth", the POW camp Magneto is held in as a child is visually similar (in the opening shot) to Auschwitz, though it is not identified as such.

In addition, Beast's origin is almost identical to that of the comic, despite the change in profession and setting. Mesmero is shown as part of a circus troupe, much like his appearance in the "Phoenix Saga". Aside from this, supporting characters like Bolivar Trask, Nick Fury, Captain America, Destiny, Agatha Harkness and Amanda Sefton were all taken from the X-Men comic, usually serving to homage to originals without necessarily staying completely faithful to their form.

Another difference between the comic and the show is the name changes. Toad, originally Mortimer Toynbee, is changed to Todd Tolansky, and Avalanche, originally Dominic Petros, is changed to Lance Alvers. Both changed names have similarities to their codenames. Also, their nationalities were changed to American from, respectively, British and Greek.

Evolution characters in the comics and films 
X-23, an original character introduced in later seasons, made her comic book debut in the miniseries NYX, where her appearance was slightly altered to more closely resemble Wolverine. She received a self-titled comic miniseries in 2005. Much like Harley Quinn of Batman: The Animated Series, Terry McGinnis of Batman Beyond, Cinderblock of Teen Titans, or Marvel's own Firestar of Spider-Man and His Amazing Friends, she was a character originally created for an animated series that was incorporated into comic book canon. The character of Dr. Deborah Risman which created X-23, the clone of Wolverine, was also created for the show and was replaced with a similar character named Dr. Sarah Kinney in the miniseries X-23.

The comic book X-Statix featured an African-American mutant with the same codename and abilities as Spyke; however, this version of Spyke was not related to Storm, had a very different personality (modeled after popular gangsta rappers), and is a completely separate character. Another similar character appeared in X-Men: The Last Stand, but as a member of the Brotherhood of Mutants. He is listed as Spike in the credits, but is not mentioned by name in the film, and has no dialogue. When Wolverine invades the forest base of the Brotherhood, Spike is one of the characters that attacks him, demonstrating abilities identical to those shown by the Spyke character before he lost control of his mutation. Another similar character, who bears a greater resemblance to Spyke appears in X-Men: Days of Future Past, but again, he is not named. In the canon Storm has a teenaged cousin, not a nephew, named David Evans, but he is apparently too young to display any mutant abilities.

Marvel references and cameos 
X-Men: Evolution weaves many references and cameos into its show. One of the masks worn by the vandals in the Season 3 episode "Mainstream", bears a suitable resemblance to the classic Marvel Comics monster, Fin Fang Foom. In the Season 3 episode "Under Lock and Key", circumstances gather a mix of X-Men, junior members, and nonmembers into a mission team that matches the original X-Men team (Cyclops, Jean Grey, Beast, Iceman, and Angel)—Iceman mentions that this is "definitely the cool team." In the Season 3 episode "Dark Horizons Part 1" when Rogue enters Kitty's room, Kitty is seen sleeping with a stuffed purple dragon, a reference to Lockheed, her purple dragon companion. Also in "Dark Horizons Part 2", Nightcrawler, Colossus, and Shadowcat are grouped together when the X-Men and the Acolytes are separated, a reference to the Europe-based superhero team Excalibur which included all three mutants in its roster.

Captain America is the only non-mutant Marvel superhero and mutate to appear on Evolution. There is also, however, a small Iron Man reference in the episode "On Angel's Wings", when a sign reading "Stark Enterprises" is seen during an exterior shot of New York City and a small Spider-Man reference when Angel was reading the Daily Bugle, the newspaper that Peter Parker/Spider-Man normally takes pictures for. In addition, Omega Red mentions Maverick and Kestrel in the episode "Target X", referring to the latter as "Wraith". In "Dark Horizons Part 2" the hieroglyphics translated by Beast refer to the Pharaoh Rama-Tut, one identity of Kang the Conqueror.

Home media release

iTunes 
All four seasons are available for download in SD format on iTunes (Only available for America), being released in 2009 by Marvel. All 4 seasons immediately broke into the Top 10 Animation charts on iTunes, with season 4 peaking at #3.

DVD

Streaming services 
 Disney+ - All four seasons are currently available as of November 2019.
 Netflix - The series is not currently available on Netflix, though does offer the DVD.
 YouTube - All four seasons were uploaded on YouTube, however Marvel Entertainment's YouTube channel listed them as private.
 Google Play - All four seasons are currently available on Google Play, although the show is inaccessible in some countries, such as Poland.
 Hulu - Hulu had all episodes available on streaming as early as 2009. However, it is no longer available.
 Amazon - All four seasons are currently available on Amazon Instant Video.
 iTunes - All four seasons are currently available for purchase on the iTunes Store.
 HBO Max - All four seasons are currently available on streaming in Latin America since September 17, 2022.

Merchandise

Comic books 
In January 2002, Marvel Comics began publishing an X-Men: Evolution comic book, partially based on the show. Written by Devin K. Grayson with art by Studio XD, it was abruptly canceled after the ninth issue due to low sales. The series has been reprinted in two trade paperbacks.

The comic introduced the Evolution version of the Morlocks before they appeared on the show, and their appearances and motivations were radically different in both versions. It also featured an appearance from Mimic who never appeared on the show.

An ongoing plot line would have introduced the Evolution version of Mister Sinister, but the comic was canceled before it could be resolved. However, the cover of the unreleased issue 10 does reveal his intended character design.

Action figurines 
Toy Biz created a line of action figures. Taco Bell ran the first X-Men: Evolution themed promotion with its Kid's Meals. Burger King also ran a Kid's Meal promotion which included X-Men: Evolution toys. Each toy included a mini-disc with games, screen-savers, and a mini-comic related to the character. The lineup included Rogue, Mystique, Cyclops, Wolverine, Magneto, Quicksilver, Nightcrawler, and Toad.

Notes

References

External links

 
 

 
2000 American television series debuts
2003 American television series endings
2000s American animated television series
2000s American science fiction television series
American children's animated action television series
American children's animated adventure television series
American children's animated science fantasy television series
American children's animated superhero television series
Animated series produced by Marvel Studios
Animated television series based on Marvel Comics
Anime-influenced Western animated television series
English-language television shows
Kids' WB original shows
Teen animated television series
Teen superhero television series
Television series by Film Roman
Television series by Warner Bros. Television Studios
Television shows based on Marvel Comics
Television shows set in New York (state)
Works by Christopher Yost